Relevant (often styled as RELEVANT) is a bi-monthly Christian lifestyle magazine. The magazine is published by Relevant Media Group with an average distributed circulation of 70,000 copies. According to a demographic study in 2012, 86% of Relevant's subscribers are between the ages of 18 and 39 (the average subscriber's age is 27). The magazine's companion web presence, relevantmagazine.com, launched in 2002 with the email newsletter, "850 Words of Relevant" (now called "Relevant This Week"). Relevant launched its interactive iPad edition in September 2011. The website consists of daily news, reviews, and original and exclusive content from contributors. In 2012 the site averaged more than 500,000 visitors a month. In September 2020, Relevant announced the suspension of its print edition, shifting to an all-digital format and maintaining its bi-monthly release schedule.

History
Both the magazine and the website are products of the Relevant Media Group, founded by Cameron Strang, son of Charisma Magazine publisher and Strang Communications CEO Stephen Strang, in June 2001. 

Relevant magazine was first published in March 2003.  From a sociological perspective, one critic has called the publication "the mass media equivalent of outreach in the skate park." It is distributed nationally at Barnes & Noble and other retailers, and is a top seller at the Family Christian bookstore chain. 

In its early years, contributors to the print magazine included John Fischer, Dan Haseltine (Jars of Clay), Don Chaffer (Waterdeep), and Dan Buck. Relevant runs articles about faith, life in your 20s and 30s, social justice, and interviews with musicians and authors such as Donald Miller, Bob Goff, The Avett Brothers, Rob Bell, and The Civil Wars.

In 2005, Relevant Media Group created a women's magazine, Radiant, which published 12 issues from 2005-2007.

In 2008, Relevant Media Group launched a magazine for church leaders, Neue.

In 2011, Relevant launched a free semi-annual social justice magazine, Reject Apathy. It was included with Relevant subscriptions.

Relevant launched its interactive iPad edition in September 2011.

RelevantMagazine.com
The website is updated daily and is a counterpart to the magazine. It includes daily features, news ("slices"), columns, reviews, and features such as "The Drop" and "RELEVANT.tv".

Relevant podcast
Relevant releases a new podcast every Monday and Thursday. Its weekly listenership topped 100,000 in 2012. The podcast won the 2015 Academy of Podcasters Awards in the Spirituality & Religion category. On September 12, 2022, the Relevant Podcast released their 1,000 episode.

References

External links
 
USA Today article from 2004
Transcript of a CNN interview with Cameron Strang
Relevant Media Group website
It's young, it's hip and it's Christian. The Orlando Sentinel, March 25, 2003

2003 establishments in the United States
Bimonthly magazines published in the United States
Religious magazines published in the United States
Christian magazines
Magazines established in 2003
Magazines published in Florida